Nižný Klátov (1332/5 Inferior Turastukes, 1397 Al Teukes, 1400 Inferior Bokkenzeifin, 1580 Nieder-Beckseyffen) is a village and municipality in Košice-okolie District in the Košice Region of eastern Slovakia.

History
In historical records the village was first mentioned in 1317 as a German medieval settlement.

Geography
The village lies at an altitude of 370 metres and covers an area of 5.94 km².
It has a population of 636 people.

Ethnicity
All population is Slovak

Culture
The village has a public library, football ground and a guesthouse.

External links
statisticsl
http://www.cassovia.sk/klatov/

Villages and municipalities in Košice-okolie District